Thinning is the transformation of a digital image into a simplified, but topologically equivalent image. It is a type of topological skeleton, but computed using mathematical morphology operators.

Example 

Let , and consider the eight composite structuring elements, composed by: 

 and 
The corresponding composite structuring elements are denoted . 

For any i between 1 and 8, and any binary image X, define
,
where  denotes the set-theoretical difference and  denotes the hit-or-miss transform.

The thinning of an image A is obtained by cyclically iterating until convergence:

.

Thickening 
Thickening is the dual of thinning that is used to grow selected regions of foreground pixels. In most cases in image processing thickening is performed by thinning the background 

References

Mathematical morphology
Digital geometry